Gotsiridze is a Georgian surname that may refer to:

 Beka Gotsiridze (born 1988), footballer
 Revaz Gotsiridze (born 1981), footballer
 Rusudan Gotsiridze (born 1975), bishop 
 Nadya Gotsiridze-Columbus, President of Nova Science Publishers, Inc

Surnames of Abkhazian origin
Georgian-language surnames